is the fourth addition to the Yu-Gi-Oh! anime meta-series, as well as the 1st main spin-off series. The plot centers around Jaden Yuki and his friends, and tells of their adventures at Duel Academy, a school that teaches students how to play the card game Duel Monsters. Season two, the Society of Light Saga, covers their second year at the Academy. This season was broadcast by 4Kids Entertainment as Yu-Gi-Oh! GX.

Summary
The season begins with the dinosaur-obsessed drill sergeant Tyranno Hassleberry joining the Academy. He joins the Ra Yellow dorm and quickly becomes friends with Jaden. Also arriving with the new students is pro duelist Aster Phoenix. Aster is later revealed to be part of an organization known as the Society of Light, who are out to take over the world. The true evil behind the Society begins to show itself, brainwashing the Academy's students, including several of Jaden's friends.  At the same time, the "Genex Tournament" begins in the school, with students and pros alike competing.  During the tournament, Sartorius, the leader of the Society of Light, gains control of a powerful laser satellite, with the power to brainwash the entire world. Jaden and the others work together with Aster Phoenix to save the world and free Sartorius from the evil that controls him.

Episode list

References

General

Specific

2005 Japanese television seasons
2006 Japanese television seasons
GX (season 2)